Say What You Mean is the third studio album of the  Washington-based music group Maktub.

Track listing
  "Promise Me"  – 4:28
  "Say What You Mean"  – 4:11
  "20 Years"  – 5:21
  "Daily Dosage"  – 3:38
  "Hunt You Down"  – 4:16
  "Seeing Is Believing"  – 3:39
  "Blown Away"  – 5:09
  "Feel Like Another One"  – 4:31
  "Nobody Loves You Like I Do"  – 4:28
  "Right to Breathe"  – 5:24

References 

Maktub albums
2005 albums
Albums produced by Steve Fisk
Albums produced by Joe Chiccarelli